Actinoptera schnabeli is a species of tephritid or fruit flies in the genus Actinoptera of the family Tephritidae.

Distribution
Tanzania.

References

Tephritinae
Insects described in 1924
Diptera of Africa
Taxa named by Paul Gustav Eduard Speiser